The W67 was an American thermonuclear warhead developed from June 1966 but then cancelled prior to any production or service use approximately 18 months later.

Developed by Los Alamos, the warhead was in the megaton range and was to have a yield comparable to that of the W56. It was housed in the Mark 17 reentry vehicle and one of the warhead's design goals was the highest maximum output temperature possible. Only one partial yield test of the warhead was performed before the warhead was cancelled in January 1968. Hansen identifies this test as Crosstie Zara.

The Mark 17 RV had a difficult development.

After its cancellation, the W68 warhead was developed for Poseidon and the W62 warhead for Minuteman III.

See also
 List of nuclear weapons
 LGM-30 Minuteman
 UGM-73 Poseidon

References

External links

Nuclear warheads of the United States
1960s in the United States